Horodok Raion was one of the 20 administrative raions (a district) of Khmelnytskyi Oblast in western Ukraine. Its administrative center was located in the city of Horodok. Its population was 58,348  as of the 2001 Ukrainian Census. The raion was abolished on 18 July 2020 as part of the administrative reform of Ukraine, which reduced the number of raions of Khmelnytskyi Oblast to three. The area of Horodok Raion was merged into Khmelnytskyi Raion. The last estimate of the raion population was

History
Horodok Raion was located in the southwestern part of the Khmelnytskyi Oblast, corresponding to the modern-day boundaries of the Podolia historical region. It was established on March 7, 1923 as part of a full-scale administrative reorganization of the Ukrainian Soviet Socialist Republic.

Subdivisions

At the time of disestablishment, the raion consisted of two hromadas:
 Horodok urban hromada with the administration in Horodok;
 Sataniv settlement hromada with the administration in the urban-type settlement of Sataniv.

Horodok Raion was divided in a way that follows the general administrative scheme in Ukraine. Local government was also organized along a similar scheme nationwide. Consequently, raions were subdivided into councils, which were the prime level of administrative division in the country.

Each of the raion's urban localities administered their own councils, often containing a few other villages within its jurisdiction. However, only a handful of rural localities were organized into councils, which also might contain a few villages within its jurisdiction.

Accordingly, the Horodok Raion was divided into: 
 1 city council—made up of the city of Horodok (administrative center)
 1 settlement council—made up of the urban-type settlement of Sataniv
 29 village councils

Overall, the raion had a total of 74 populated localities, consisting of one city, one urban-type settlement, 71 villages, and one rural settlement.

Places of interest
 Sataniv Castle

References

External links
 
 

Former raions of Khmelnytskyi Oblast
States and territories established in 1923
1923 establishments in Ukraine
Ukrainian raions abolished during the 2020 administrative reform